The title of tallest building in the British Empire (later in the Commonwealth) has been contested since the late nineteenth century. In this era the nations of the British Empire possessed a large measure of cultural unity and naturally looked to each other for comparison and competition. This was evident in the  displays at Queen Victoria's silver and diamond jubilees and in the creation of the British Empire Games in 1930 (later the Commonwealth Games). A similar phenomenon occurred in the world of architecture and civics. Local boosters in cities and regions across the Empire covered the title of "greatest", "biggest", "largest" or "best" in the Empire.

This boosterism was concentrated in Canada where desire to claim the title spawned a race between cities and builders between 1905 and 1931.

In general the boosters focused on commercial buildings, as claiming the title was part of marketing the building to potential renters (and the city to the wider world). They conveniently ignored much taller non-commercial buildings such as St Paul's Cathedral which stands  and was consecrated in 1708, or Victoria Tower in the Palace of Westminster which was built in 1855 and measures , and the Blackpool Tower, built in 1894, and standing at 158 meters (518 feet) tall. The Commonwealth of Nations slowly evolved out of the British Empire over decades, but the 1931 Statute of Westminster is often used as a dividing point. During the twentieth century the title was held primarily by Canadian buildings.  Since the 1990s, however, Asian buildings have held the title.

Height restrictions have much to do with this list. Until the 1960s, London, the capital of the Empire, had especially strict height maxima to preserve the views of historic structures. Until the late 1920s, Montreal limited all buildings to a maximum of 10 stories, and it still limits buildings to less than the sea-level elevation of Mont Royal. Since 1989 Vancouver restricted buildings from blocking the North Shore Mountains, creating a practical upper limit of around 137 meters, until 1997 when seven sites were pre-selected for taller buildings as exceptions to the rule. Singapore limits all buildings to below 280 meters because of the proximity of Singapore Changi Airport.

The International Commerce Centre in Hong Kong is not included because it was built after Hong Kong left the Commonwealth.

The list also excludes Toronto's CN Tower as there is debate as to whether it is technically a building, or merely a structure.

Tallest buildings in the Commonwealth

Tallest buildings in the Empire

See also
 List of tallest structures in the Commonwealth of Nations

Notes

References

British Empire and the British Commonwealth
Tallest buildings
Tallest buildings